Emma Previato (1952-2022) was a professor of mathematics at Boston University. Her research concerns algebraic geometry and partial differential equations.

Career
Previato received her Ph.D. from Harvard University in 1983 under David Mumford. She was a faculty member at Boston University.

Previato founded Boston University's chapters of the Mathematical Association of America and of the Association for Women in Mathematics.

Awards and honors

In 2003, Previato received the Mathematical Association of America Northeastern Section's Award for Distinguished College or
University Teaching of Mathematics for her work in and out of the classroom, especially her mentoring of students.

In 2012, Previato became a fellow of the American Mathematical Society.

Selected publications
 Adams, M. R.; Harnad, J.; Previato, E. Isospectral Hamiltonian flows in finite and infinite dimensions. I. Generalized Moser systems and moment maps into loop algebras. Comm. Math. Phys. 117 (1988), no. 3, 451–500. 
 Previato, Emma. Hyperelliptic quasiperiodic and soliton solutions of the nonlinear Schrödinger equation. Duke Math. J. 52 (1985), no. 2, 329–377.
Eilbeck, J. C.; Enolski, V. Z.; Matsutani, S.; Ônishi, Y.; Previato, E. Abelian functions for trigonal curves of genus three. Int. Math. Res. Not. IMRN 2008, no. 1, Art. ID rnm 140, 38 pp.

References

1952 births
Living people
American women mathematicians
20th-century American mathematicians
21st-century American mathematicians
Algebraic geometers
Harvard University alumni
Boston University faculty
Fellows of the American Mathematical Society
20th-century women mathematicians
21st-century women mathematicians
20th-century American women
21st-century American women